China Railway No.2 Group Co., Ltd. and China Railway Erju Engineering Co., Ltd. were two closely connected companies. They are formerly parent-subsidiary via China Railway Erju Co., Ltd. (CREC). The group is a Chinese construction company based in Chengdu.

China Railway Erju is formerly listed on the Shanghai Stock Exchange; In turn, Erju (literally means the second bureau [of the former Ministry of Railways]) is an indirect subsidiary of China Railway Group Limited (also abb. CREC, successor of China Railway Engineering Corporation), which in turn indirectly supervised by the State-owned Assets Supervision and Administration Commission of the State Council.

In January 2017, China Railway Group Limited backdoor listing some assets, as well as privatized China Railway Erju's subsidiary China Railway Erju Engineering Co., Ltd.. China Railway Erju was renamed to China Railway Hi-tech Industry (CRHIC) after the transactions.

History

Predecessor 
The predecessor of the company was found in 1998 (China Railway No.2 Group Co., Ltd.), which could be traced back to 1978, as the Second Bureau of Engineering of the Ministry of Railways. The original second bureau could traced back the history to 1950, but in 1978 the bureau was split into the [new] second bureau and the fifth bureau.

IPO 
In 2000, China Railway Engineering Corporation, the parent company at that time, was independent from the ministry. In 1999, most of the assets of "China Railway No.2 Group Co., Ltd." was injected into a new subsidiary China Railway Erju Co., Ltd.  and floats in the Shanghai Stock Exchange in 2001. In 2007, an intermediate parent company China Railway Group Limited was formed, and also listed in the stock exchanges.

In 2015, a subsidiary China Railway Erju Engineering was incorporated.

Privatization 
In January 2017 China Railway Erju Engineering was sold back to China Railway Group Limited (making China Railway Erju Engineering and China Railway No.2 Group Co., Ltd. were sister company but no parent-subsidiary connection), at the same time China Railway Group Limited inject some asset to China Railway Erju Co., Ltd. as backdoor listing, renaming to China Railway Hi-tech Industry.

China Railway Erju Construction Co., Ltd. is a company that owned by both China Railway Erju Engineering and China Railway No.2 Group directly and indirectly by China Railway Group Limited.

Projects 
 Hangzhou Bay Bridge (sub-contractor)
 Datong–Xi'an Passenger Railway
 Xiamen–Shenzhen Railway
 Shuangliu Airport Railway Station
 A'ergelete Mountain Tunnel
 Guangfo Metro
 Lanzhou–Xinjiang High-Speed Railway
  Addis-Sebeta-Mieso Railway
  Khartoum-Port Sudan Railway

References

External links 
 

Companies based in Chengdu
Companies formerly listed on the Shanghai Stock Exchange
Construction and civil engineering companies of China
Railway construction companies of China
Chinese companies established in 1998
Organizations established in 1978
Government-owned companies of China